Arnheim is a historic plantation house located at Radford, Virginia. It was built between 1838 and 1840, and is a two-story, three-bay, Federal / Greek Revival–style brick dwelling. It is a symmetrical double-pile plan dwelling, 40 feet square, and sitting on a raised brick basement. In 1939, it was converted into a home economics annex for the adjacent Radford High School. Arnheim was built by Dr. John Blair Radford, for whom the City of Radford is named. The property also includes a documented contributing archaeological site.

It was listed on the National Register of Historic Places in 2002.

References

Plantation houses in Virginia
Houses on the National Register of Historic Places in Virginia
Archaeological sites on the National Register of Historic Places in Virginia
Houses completed in 1840
Federal architecture in Virginia
Greek Revival houses in Virginia
Buildings and structures in Radford, Virginia
National Register of Historic Places in Radford, Virginia
Houses in Radford, Virginia